Tine Van Aerschot (born 1961, Mechelen) is a Belgian graphic designer, dramatic adviser, writer and theatre director.

Education
Tine Van Aerschot studied visual arts and computer graphics.

Collaboration with Meg Stuart / Damaged Goods
Tine Van Aerschot started working in theatre in 1987 at the STUK arts centre and the dance festival Klapstuk in Leuven (Belgium). She was the production assistant on Disfigure Study (1991), the debut choreography by the American choreographer Meg Stuart, who she had discovered in New York. She contributed to her international breakthrough. From 1999 to 2004 she was the graphic designer of Damaged Goods, the dance company of Meg Stuart.

Collaboration with others
After Disfigure Study (Meg Stuart, 1991), Tine Van Aerschot was also the production assistant for the American choreographer Dennis O'Connor (Amor Omnia, 1993) and the dramatic adviser for the Belgian choreographer Christine De Smedt (L'union fait la force fait l'union, 1993 and de Hemelschutters). She also worked as a photographer on Too Shy to Stare (2003) by the American performance artist Davis Freeman, and was responsible for the scenography of Private Rooms (2002), a dance performance by the Canadian dancer / choreographer Sara Chase. For the New Zealand dance and performance artist Simone Aughterlony she worked as the artistic advisor and graphic designer on her pieces Public Property (2004) and Performers on Trial (2005) and as the co-author and advisor on Bare Back Lying (2006). Tine Van Aerschot also designed leaflets, posters and websites for various dance and theatre productions and companies.

Own artistic work
Tine Van Aerschot only began to develop her own work in 2002. It originally revolved around her alter ego Trevor Wells, and began with a series of emails, followed by a multimedia project - all under the title The Wherebouts of Trevor Wells. With her visual work she participated in the group exhibition A room or one's own (de Markten, Brussels, 2006 and Kunstlerhaus Betanien, Berlin, 2007). From 2006, a series of theatre texts and theatre productions followed. They were first produced by Palindroom vzw, a production structure that she shared with film artist Els Van Riel, and subsequently by TREVOR vzw, her own production structure. The theatre productions were co-produced by the Kaaitheater (Brussels) and Vooruit (Ghent). In Belgium she also received support from wpZimmer (Antwerp), Kunstencentrum BUDA (Kortrijk), the Pianofabriek (Sint-Gillis), Workspacebrussels (Brussels), the Flemish Community Commission of the Brussels-Capital Region and the Flemish government. International support came from Mousonturm (Frankfurt), PACT Zollverein (Essen) and Gessnerallee (Zürich).

Work as a teacher
In November 2008, Tine Van Aerschot presented a workshop on Meaning of Text in Contemporary Performance at the invitation of the Royal Scottish Academy of Music and Drama (Glasgow), and in April 2009 she tutored students in a workshop on text and dramaturgy at the invitation of the APT Hogeschool (Utrecht).

Theatre productions
 I have no thoughts and this is one of them (2006), a monologue in the form of a summary, a worldview built on only denials.
 Triple Trooper Trevor Trumpet Girl (2009), a theatre piece with two actresses in the form of a failed diary full of questions and concerns about everything and nothing.
 We are not afraid of the dark (2012), a monologue about survival and therefore also about dying.
 When in doubt, duck (2015), a performance featuring two actresses and an actor inspired by the translations, rephrasings and infinite flow of multimedia information that floods society.
 Het betreft liefde (2018), a performance with three actresses based on conversations with children and adults about their love experiences, and on remarkable love stories from history and literature.

Publications
The theatre texts of Tine Van Aerschot are published at De Nieuwe Toneelbibliotheek (Amsterdam), which has been working since 2009 on making Dutch-language theatre texts better available, both digitally and in book form. In 2013, De Nieuwe Toneelbibliotheek also published the book A Partial Exposure of A Half Decent Elephant, the first result of a research by Tine Van Aerschot on the changing meanings of words and concepts through translations, rephrasings and shifts in time. That theme was later featured in the theatre production When in Doubt, Duck. 
Published theatre texts
 I have no thoughts and this is one of them (Tine Van Aerschot, 2006, De Nieuwe Toneelbibliotheek #111)
 Triple Trooper Trevor Trompet girl (Tine Van Aerschot, 2008, De Nieuwe Toneelbibliotheek #110)
 We are not afraid of the dark (Tine Van Aerschot, 2012, De Nieuwe Toneelbibliotheek #222)
 When in doubt, duck (Tine Van Aerschot, 2015, De Nieuwe Toneelbibliotheek #299)
 Het betreft: liefde (Tine Van Aerschot, 2018, De Nieuwe Toneelbibliotheek #456)
Other book publications
 A Partial Exposure of A Half Decent Elephant (Tine Van Aerschot, 2013, De Nieuwe Toneelbibliotheek#199)
In 2015, in full migration crisis, Tine Van Aerschot, with her production structure TREVOR vzw, was also responsible for the re-release of Zjefke in de Grote Oorlog (Zjefke in the Great War), a book from 2004 by her father André Van Aerschot. She received the support of the Kaaitheater and the KU Leuven; the then rector Rik Torfs of the KU Leuven wrote the new preface. The full proceeds go to Vluchtelingenwerk Vlaanderen.

De Klas van Tine (The Class of Tine)
In 2017, Tine Van Aerschot moved from Brussels to Ostend, where she was artist-in-residence at the cultural centre De Grote Post during the season 2017-2018. During the season 2018-2019, she organises De Klas van Tine (The Class of Tine), a series of evenings during which she always talks with another guest "about life and death, about new life and maintaining existing life, about the profane and the human." With the talks she wants to contribute to the cultural life of De Grote Post and the city of Ostend. Her guests include amongst others marine biologist Jan Seys, doula Veerle Peeters and artist Gosie Vervloessem.

References

Further reading
 Michaël Bellon, 'We are not afraid of the dark' van Tine Van Aerschot, in: Brussel Deze Week, 25/02/2012
 Pieter T'Jonck, Gedachteloos, in: De Morgen, 14/03/2007
 Sarah Theerlynck, Tine Van Aerschot (theatermaakster): 'Vreemd als werkproces samensmelt met rouwproces', in: De Morgen, 29/02/2012

External links
 Biography of Tine Van Aerschot on the website of Kunstencentrum BUDA
 Interview with Tine Van Aerschot, Kaaitheater, 2015
 Kunstenpunt - Persons - Tine van Aerschot according to the Flanders Arts Institute
 Page about Tine Van Aerschot on the website of De Nieuwe Toneelbibliotheek
 Page about Tine Van Aerschot on the website of Klein Verzet
 The Sunday Scene - Performance Art Podcast live from Veem: #2. With main guest Tine van Aerschot, 06/12/2015

1961 births
Living people
Belgian theatre directors
Belgian graphic designers
Women graphic designers
Women theatre directors